Lanceolidae is a family of amphipods belonging to the order Amphipoda.

Genera:
 Lanceola Say, 1818
 Scypholanceola Woltereck, 1905

References

Amphipoda